Serixia testaceicollis is a species of beetle in the family Cerambycidae. It was described by Kano in 1933.

References

Serixia
Beetles described in 1933